The Caterham CT05 is a Formula One racing car that competed in the 2014 Formula One Season.  It was the last Caterham F1 car before the team folded prior to the start of the 2015 season.

The car was driven by debutant Marcus Ericsson and Kamui Kobayashi who returned to Formula One after a season driving in the FIA World Endurance Championship with AF Corse.  André Lotterer replaced Kobayashi for the Belgian Grand Prix, and Will Stevens replaced Ericsson for the Abu Dhabi Grand Prix. Alongside the drivers, Caterham also operated a driver programme which expanded in mid 2014 when Christijan Albers took over as CEO. Drivers who were involved with CT05 either through practice runs or development included Robin Frijns, Alexander Rossi, Julian Leal, Rio Haryanto and Nathanaël Berthon.

Development

The CT05 was designeed by Mark Smith, Lewis Butler and Hari Roberts at the new Leafield Technical Centre.  The engine was the new Renault Energy F1-2014, and the gearbox from Red Bull Technology. Ahead of 2014, the team had struck an agreement with Toyota Motorsport to utilise their wind tunnel for testing and development, alongside upgraded CFD capacity at the new base.

The CT05 was launched during pre-season testing in Jerez in late January, 2014. Marcus Ericsson drove the new car first on track.  Notably the car had a very unique nosecone. The CT05 also noted for having a rear and wing design similar to Red Bull Racing.  By August, the controversial nose design was adapted slightly to a more rounded design.

The CT05 featured a new livery design for the team, a bold metallic green set off with flashed of white, yellow and black.  Airbus, GE and Dell Computers Intel took major sponsorship on the car.  After the team missed two races due to funding, the final race of the season saw a car adorned with sponsors who had helped the CT05 reach the final race of the year.

Racing Performance
The car performed poorly throughout the season.  At the first Grand Prix of the year in Australia, both drivers retired.  Indeed, the CT05 would chalk up 12 retirements in total, and three Grand Prix where neither car finished.

The best result of the season was in Monaco, for Marcus Ericsson who finished in 11th place.

André Lotterer took over driving the CT05 at Belgium as Kobayashi, with no specific reason given. He would ultimately retire from the race. Kobayashi returned to the car, and in Singapore he failed to start the race as his brakes failed on the formation lap.

Financial difficulties hit the team and they failed to field either CT05 at the United States or Brazilian Grand Prix.  However, they returned for the final round in Abu Dhabi where Will Stevens drove in place of Ericsson before folding.

Complete Formula One results
(key)

‡ — Teams and drivers scored double points at the

References

CT05
2014 Formula One season cars